Suzana may refer to:

Suzana Al-Salkini (born 1984), Macedonian model
Suzana Alves (born 1978), Brazilian sex symbol
Suzana Amaral (born 1932), Brazilian film director and screenwriter
Suzana Ansar (born 1978), English singer and actress
Suzana Ćebić (born 1984), female volleyball player from Serbia, playing as a libero
Suzana Dinić (born 1986), Serbian singer and pianist, the member of the girlband Beauty Queens
Suzana Ferreira da Silva, Brazilian footballer
Suzana Jovanović, popular Serbian turbo-folk singer
Suzana Perović (born 1962), Serbian singer
Suzana, Senegal, a village in the Bignona Department of Senegal

Serbian feminine given names